Steve Goodman is the debut album of singer/songwriter Steve Goodman, released in 1971. It included both of his most well-known compositions: "City of New Orleans", first covered by Arlo Guthrie, and an early version of "You Never Even Call Me by My Name," which, with some modifications, was covered by David Allan Coe. The album was reissued on CD in 1999 and included two bonus tracks, "Election Year Rag" and "Georgia Rag". The album was a critical success, although a commercial failure.

Reception

In reviewing the 1999 reissue, Allmusic critic William Ruhlmann called "City of New Orleans" the "obvious standout" and wrote, "At a time when sensitive singer/songwriters were all the rage (a trend that probably earned Goodman his record contract), this was one guy who was at least as interested in picking an old country song as he was in baring his soul."

Track listing
"The I Don't Know Where I'm Going, But I'm Goin' Nowhere in a Hurry Blues" – 2:32
"Rainbow Road" (Donnie Fritts, Dan Penn) – 3:33
"Donald & Lydia" (John Prine) – 4:54
"You Never Even Call Me by My Name" (Steve Goodman, John Prine) – 4:24
"Mind Your Own Business" (Hank Williams) – 2:54
"Eight Ball Blues" – 4:24
"City of New Orleans" – 3:52
"Turnpike Tom" – 4:15
"Yellow Coat" – 4:44
"So Fine" – (Johnny Otis) – 3:19	
"Jazzman" (Edward Mark Holstein) – 3:42
"Would You Like to Learn to Dance?" – 4:07
"Election Year Rag" - 2:03
"Georgia Rag" - 2:00

Personnel 
Steve Goodman – vocals, guitar
David Briggs – piano
Kenny Buttrey – percussion
Vassar Clements – fiddle
Norbert Putnam – bass
Donnie Fritts – organ
Bob Dylan – piano on "Election Year Rag"
Ben Keith – dobro, guitar, pedal steel guitar
Stephen Brunton – guitar, percussion, backing vocals
Grady Martin – guitar
Pete Wade – guitar
Billy Sanford – banjo, guitar
Bucky Willkin – guitar, backing vocals
Kris Kristofferson – backing vocals
Bill Swofford – backing vocals
John Prine – backing vocals
Charlie McCoy – harmonica, organ
Martha McCrory – cello
Gene Mullins – trombone
Dennis Good – trombone
Billy Puett – clarinet
George Tidwell – trumpet

Production
Norbert Putnam – producer
Kris Kristofferson – producer
Gene Eichelberger – engineer, mixing
Gene Hazen – mixing
Bob Cato – photography, design

References

1971 debut albums
Steve Goodman albums
Albums produced by Norbert Putnam